Hebra may refer to:

 Hebra (gastropod), a genus of marine snail in the family Nassariidae
a zebroid that is a crossing between a horse stallion and a zebra mare
Ferdinand Ritter von Hebra, Austrian physician and dermatologist